Heterogeneous nuclear ribonucleoprotein F is a protein that in humans is encoded by the HNRNPF gene.

This gene belongs to the subfamily of ubiquitously expressed heterogeneous nuclear ribonucleoproteins (hnRNPs). The hnRNPs are RNA binding proteins that complex with heterogeneous nuclear RNA (hnRNA). These proteins are associated with pre-mRNAs in the nucleus and regulate alternative splicing, polyadenylation, and other aspects of mRNA metabolism and transport. 

While all of the hnRNPs are present in the nucleus, some seem to shuttle between the nucleus and the cytoplasm. The hnRNP proteins have distinct nucleic acid binding properties. The protein encoded by this gene has three repeats of quasi-RRM domains that bind to RNAs which have guanosine-rich sequences. This protein is very similar to the family member hnRNPH. Multiple alternatively spliced variants, encoding the same protein, have been identified.

References

Further reading